Cairns Airport  is an international airport in Cairns, Queensland, Australia. Formerly operated by the Cairns Port Authority, the airport was sold by the Queensland Government in December 2008 to a private consortium. It is the seventh busiest airport in Australia. The airport lies between Mount Whitfield to the west and Trinity Bay to the east.

The airport has direct flights to 10 international and 35 domestic destinations and many general aviation flights including a number of helicopter operators. Flights are operated to all major Australian cities and tourist destinations, regional communities in Far North Queensland, and a number of international destinations in the Asia-Pacific region with connections to the rest of the world. The airport formed the main base for Australian Airlines prior to its ceasing of operations in June 2006 (the airport remains a major port for parent company Qantas). It is also a base for the Royal Flying Doctor Service of Australia and the search and rescue helicopters of the Queensland Government. In the 12 months ending 30 June 2019 Cairns Airport had just over 5 million passengers.

History

Cairns Airport goes back to 1928 when Tom McDonald started flying his de Havilland Gipsy Moth off a sand ridge near the present airport. He could only land and take off between high tides. During one emergency, Tom was forced to take off from beer barrels.

During World War II the Australian Government bought the airport for use by the Royal Australian Air Force. In 1943, the main runway was hard surfaced and lengthened to handle military aircraft. It was also used by the United States Army Air Forces as a transport base, with the 33d Troop Carrier Squadron (374th Troop Carrier Group) operating from the base during 1942.

During the 1970s, Australia's two domestic airlines Trans Australia Airlines and Ansett provided regular scheduled services to most Australian capital cities and also Papua New Guinea, while in 1975 Air Niugini became the first international airline to commence flights out of Cairns, to Port Moresby in Papua New Guinea. In 1982, redevelopment of the airport commenced. The first stage of the redevelopment was finished in 1984 and a dual International and Domestic Terminal was opened. At the end of the decade the second stage of redevelopment was completed. This included a new separate International Terminal, associated aprons and taxiways, costing an estimated $80 million. In 1997, the third stage of redevelopment was completed, during which a three-storey Airport Administration Centre was constructed providing  of office space.

A$200 million redevelopment of the Domestic terminal started in August 2007 and was completed in 2010. Check-in facilities were expanded into a common-user facility for all airlines, and the building enlarged. Five new jet bridges replaced the existing three old bridges. In January 2010, Auckland International Airport Limited announced that it had purchased 24.6 per cent of North Queensland Airports (NQA), operator of the airports at Cairns and Mackay, for about $132 million.

A further  upgrade of the Domestic terminal was begun in 2019 and completed in August 2020, at a total cost of $55 million. The purpose of the upgrade was to prepare the terminal to handle the domestic portion of the airport's projected 6 million passengers annually from 2027. The upgrade also included expanded seating areas, a new interactive children's play screen, an upgraded Parenting Room, and a new Quiet Room.

Prior to February 2020 and the coronavirus pandemic, Cairns Airport's chief aviation officer Luis Perez told the Cairns Post that he was in talks with 22 airlines to connect Cairns to destinations such as North America, Korea, Taipei, Malaysia, the Middle East, India, Vietnam and the Philippines.

In February 2022, Bonza announced that the airport would become one of its 17 destinations with the airline planning to fly to the Sunshine Coast, Rockhampton and Mackay from Cairns 

In early 2023 it was announced that the International Terminal (Terminal 1) would undergo its first major upgrade in April 2023 to a value of AUD$40-50 million. The announced upgrades would be rolled out in stages to 'minimise passenger disruptions', the first of which would feature the installation of four new glass air-bridges and the re-cladding of the exterior of the building.

Facilities

Terminals

The airport has two passenger terminals on the eastern side of the airport on reclaimed mangrove swamp. The terminals are in two separate buildings  from one another. The Domestic terminal is number 2 and it has five jet bridges and 17 gates, while the International Terminal is number 1 and it currently has six jet bridges and ten gates in total.

Runways
The flight path to the north of the main runway is located directly overhead Cairns' northern beach suburbs. The flight path to the south is located directly over central Cairns. A smaller runway 12/30 that was used for general aviation lies to the east; its final approach crossed the main runway. As of April 2011 this runway is closed and has been converted to a helipad area.

Airlines and destinations

Passenger

Cargo

Other tennants
There are operators of emergency medical retrieval and rescue services based at the airport, including Emergency Management Queensland and the Royal Flying Doctor Service.

Statistics

Ground transport
Taxi
Ranks are located near both the International and Domestic Terminals. Cairns Taxis taxi ranks are located immediately outside the International and Domestic Terminals.

Bus
Airport shuttle bus services to hotels, city centre, Northern Beaches, Palm Cove, Port Douglas and Cape Tribulation are available.

Parking
Short-term and long-term parking, including a covered car park and parking for people with a disability are located within the public carparks adjacent to both the Domestic and International Terminals.

See also
 United States Army Air Forces in Australia (World War II)
 Transportation in Australia
 List of airports in Queensland

References

External links

Buildings and structures in Cairns
Airports in Queensland
Airfields of the United States Army Air Forces in Australia
Airports established in 1928
1928 establishments in Australia
Queensland in World War II
Tourism in Cairns
Transport in Cairns
International airports in Australia